John Ronald Unger II is a former American politician and magistrate. Prior to his appointment as a Berkeley County magistrate, Unger represented the 16th district in the West Virginia Senate from 1999 to 2021. The 16th District includes all of Jefferson County and a portion of Berkeley County. At the time of his retirement from the West Virginia Senate, Unger was the third active longest-serving senator and longest serving senator from the Eastern Panhandle.

Legislature 
During his time in the Legislature, Unger served as Majority Leader of the West Virginia Senate from January 2011 until November 2014 when Democrats lost control of the Senate as a result of Republican gains in the 2014 West Virginia Senate election. Unger then served as Minority Whip until 2017 when Marion County state Sen. Roman Prezioso became the new Minority Leader and appointed former Kanawha County state Sen. Corey Palumbo as Minority Whip.

Personal 
While a student at West Virginia University, Unger was named a member of the 1992 USA TODAY All-USA Academic Team and a Truman Scholar. He also went as a Rhodes Scholar to Oxford University and has a master’s degree in divinity from the Wesley Theological Seminary in Washington, D.C.

Unger is ordained as an ELCA Lutheran pastor, and serves the congregations of St. John Lutheran Church, St. John's Episcopal Church, and Bolivar United Methodist Church in Harpers Ferry, West Virginia.  In addition, he is a chaplain for the Berkeley County Sheriff's Office.

Election results

References

External links 
John Unger - WV State Senator - personal state senate web site
West Virginia Senate Members Directory - West Virginia member directory

1969 births
Living people
Democratic Party West Virginia state senators
West Virginia University alumni
American Rhodes Scholars
21st-century American politicians